Lake Street may refer to:

Lake Street (Chicago)
Lake Street (Minneapolis)

See also
Lake Street station (disambiguation)